The India Cements Limited is a cement manufacturing company based in Chennai. It is the 9th largest listed cement company in India by revenue. The company is headed by former International Cricket Council chairman and Board of Control for Cricket in India president N. Srinivasan.

It was established in 1946 by S. N. N. Sankaralinga Iyer and the first plant was set up at Thalaiyuthu in Tamil Nadu in 1949. It has 7 integrated cement plants in Tamil Nadu, Telangana and Andhra Pradesh, one in Rajasthan (through its subsidiary, Trinetra Cement Ltd) and two grinding units, one each in Tamil Nadu and Maharashtra with a capacity of 15.5 million tonnes per annum. Sankar Cement, Coramandel Cement and Raasi Gold are the brands owned by India Cements.

India Cements directly owned the Indian Premier League franchise Chennai Super Kings from 2008 to 2014. It then transferred ownership to a separate entity named Chennai Super Kings Cricket Ltd., after the Supreme Court of India struck down the controversial amendment to the BCCI constitution's clause 6.2.4 that had allowed board officials to have commercial interests in the IPL and the Champions League T20 on 22 January 2015. India Cements is also alleged to have made controversial investments in Jagati Publications and Bharati Cements owned by Y. S. Jaganmohan Reddy.

References

External links

Indian companies established in 1946
Manufacturing companies established in 1946
Cement companies of India
Manufacturing companies based in Chennai
Companies listed on the National Stock Exchange of India
Companies listed on the Bombay Stock Exchange
India Cements